Ulrich Fugger the Younger (1490 - 1525; von der Lilie) was a German merchant and businessman from the Fugger family. Active in Augsburg, he was the second-eldest son of Ulrich Fugger the Elder and Veronika Lauginger. In 1516 he married Veronika Gassner. He was a successful businessman and his uncle Jakob Fugger planned that he would be his successor at the head of the family firm, though Ulrich the Younger died before this could happen - Ulrich's will passed over his younger brother Hieronymus as unsuitable for the succession (their elder brother Hans had died in 1515), so Jakob's eventual successor was another nephew, Anton Fugger.

Family tree

1490 births
1525 deaths
16th-century German businesspeople
Ulrich the Younger